"Cuckoo Song" is a musical piece written by Michael Praetorius (1571 – 1621). In 1977 British musician Mike Oldfield released an arrangement of the piece as a single.

Mike Oldfield single 
Mike Oldfield released a version of "Cuckoo Song" in 1977 as a non-album single on Virgin Records. The B side, a musical precursor of Incantations and which could almost be a part of it, is an original composition by Oldfield. The single (in a plain white sleeve) was included as a free bonus when the double LP Incantations was released in 1978. It is one of the many non-album singles which Oldfield released in the 1970s. "Cuckoo Song" also features Les Penning.

Track listing 
 "Cuckoo Song" – 3:13
 "Pipe Tune" – 3:27

References 

1977 singles
Mike Oldfield songs
Virgin Records singles
Year of song unknown